Homeobox protein Nkx-6.2 is a protein that in humans is encoded by the NKX6-2 gene.

References

Further reading